Diiche is a 2022 Nigerian Showmax Original thriller television series directed by James Omokwe, and co-directed by Tolu Ajayi, Fiyin Gambo, and Ifeoma Chukwuogo. The series is best known to be Nigerian first Showmax Original television series, starring Daniel K Daniel, Efa Iwara, Uzoamaka Onuoha, Frank Konwea, Uzoamaka Aniunoh, Kalu Ikeagwu, Chinyere Wilfred, and Gloria Anozie-Young.

Plot
Diiche lay emphasis on the soon-to-be-married celebrity couples, in connection to the death of Odiiche's (Uzoamaka Onuoha) fiancé Nnamdi (Daniel K Daniel), at their engagement party on a private beach, which springs up the storyline of who killed Nnamdi?. Making Odiiche, the prime suspect in the murder investigation over the death of Nnamdi, her fiancé. In the search for Nnamdi's (Daniel K. Daniel) killer, Jimi (Efa Iwara ), and Ichie G Money (Kalu Ikeagwu) was tied to the crime, as well as Kesaandu (Chinyere Wilfred).

The backstory about the series is that all suspects in Diiche, are either rich or famous enough to buy their way out.

Cast
All cast on Diiche credit adapted from The Netng;

Main
 Uzoamaka Onuoha as Odiiche Anyanwu (simply. Diiche)
 Daniel K Daniel as Nnamdi Nwokeji (simply. Nnamdi)
 Efa Iwara as Folajimi Gbajumo (simply. Jimi or Jimmy)
 Frank Konwea as Inspector Dipo Kazeem (simply. Inspector Dipo)
 Uzoamaka Aniunoh as Inspector Ijeoma Anene (simply. Inspector Ijeoma)
 Kalu Ikeagwu as Ichie G Money (simply. G Money)
 Chinyere Wilfred as Kesaandu Anyanwu (simply. Diiche's mother) 
 Gloria Anozie-Young as Adaure Nwokeji (simply. Nnamdi’s mother)

Recurring
 Amarachukwu Onoh as Afam Anyanwu (simply. Diiche's father)
 Tracey George as Kesaandu Anyanwu (simply. Diiche's mother)

Episodes
Each episode was released weekly for six weeks, every Thursday on Showmax from 	29 September to 3 November 2022.

Season 1 (2022)

Production
The television series was produced by Feemo Vision Limited and distributed by Showmax. On 6 September 2022, the official trailer was released on Showmax YouTube channel.

Premiere and release
On 27 September 2022, Showmax (trademarked as. A Showmax Original Series) hosted an exclusive screening of the first episode of the series in Victoria Island, Lagos. The event host was Chigul, and in attendance were its cast Uzoamaka Onuoha, Chinyere Wilfred, Gloria Anozie-Young, Frank Konwea, and Uzoamaka Aniunoh, alongside the show executive producer, James Omokwe and co-directors, Fiyin Gambo and Ifeoma Chukwuogo, and the creator of the series Ifeanyi Barbara Chidi were present at the event.

Reception

Critical reception

Diiche has received favourable reviews from critics. According to Guardian Saturday Magazine writer Dika Ofoma, he noted that Diiche seems geared towards tracing itself back to its root, towards finding its originality, to what made it so loved in the first place, and how it was able to make its mark in the film world despite technical challenges. Before the advent of fancy cameras and gears". On 4 November 2022, social media critics praised the final episode of the series, as the suspect of Nnamdi's killer was finally reviewed. Reviewing for Premium Times, Shola-Adido Oladotun said “Diiche was a series that left a great first impression and left viewers on the edge of their seats with every episode”. YNaija called the movie a thrilling foray into motives for murder, ogbanje tradition and modern psychology.

References

External links

Diiche at Showmax

Nigerian drama television series
2022 Nigerian television series debuts
2020s drama television series
English-language Showmax original programming